The 2014 BNP Paribas Primrose Bordeaux was a professional tennis tournament played on clay courts. It was the seventh edition of the tournament which was part of the 2014 ATP Challenger Tour. It took place in Bordeaux, France between 12 and 18 May 2014.

Singles main-draw entrants

Seeds

 1 Rankings are as of May 5, 2014.

Other entrants
The following players received wildcards into the singles main draw:
  Julien Benneteau
  Jonathan Eysseric
  Florent Serra
  Maxime Teixeira

The following players received special exempt into the singles main draw:
  Rubén Ramírez Hidalgo
  Yann Marti

The following players received entry from the qualifying draw:
  Martín Alund
  Josselin Ouanna
  Olivier Rochus
  Andrea Collarini

Doubles main-draw entrants

Seeds

 1 Rankings are as of May 5, 2014.

Other entrants
The following pairs received wildcards into the doubles main draw:
  Florent Serra /  Maxime Teixeira
  Jonathan Eysseric /  Romain Jouan
  Enzo Couacaud /  Laurent Lokoli

Champions

Singles

 Julien Benneteau def.  Steve Johnson, 6–3, 6–2

Doubles

 Marc Gicquel /  Sergiy Stakhovsky def.  Ryan Harrison /  Alex Kuznetsov by Walkover

External links
Official Website

BNP Paribas Primrose Bordeaux
BNP Paribas Primrose Bordeaux
2014 in French tennis